IHRIM may refer to:

Organisation
 International Association for Human Resource Information Management, a professional organisation for human resource information management workers
 Institute for Health Record and Information Management, organisation promoting professionalism in and awareness of health record and information management in the United Kingdom